Franco Di Giacomo (18 September 1932 – 30 April 2016) was an Italian cinematographer.

Born in Amatrice (Rieti), he won the 1983 David di Donatello for Best Cinematography for Paolo and Vittorio Taviani's The Night of the Shooting Stars. He also worked, among others, with Nanni Moretti, Ettore Scola, Marco Bellocchio, Michael Radford, Bernardo Bertolucci, Dino Risi, Nikita Mikhalkov and Mario Monicelli. In 2000 Di Giacomo received a Flaiano Prize for his career.

Selected filmography 
 
 Kill the Fatted Calf and Roast It (1970)
 When Women Had Tails (1970)
 The Most Beautiful Wife (1970)
 Million Dollar Eel (1971)
 Four Flies on Grey Velvet (1971)
 Who Saw Her Die? (1972)
 La Tosca (1973)
 Polvere di stelle (1973) 
 La sbandata (1974)
 Libera, My Love (1975)
 The Sex Machine (1975)
 Duck in Orange Sauce (1975)
 Plot of Fear (1976)
 Tell Me You Do Everything for Me (1976)
 Victory March (1976)
 The Bishop's Bedroom (1977)
 Hitch-Hike (1977)
 They Call Him Bulldozer (1978)
 Amori miei (1978)
 Sahara Cross (1978)
 The Sheriff and the Satellite Kid (1979)
 The Meadow (1979)
 Men or Not Men (1980)
 Everything Happens to Me (1980)
 The Day Christ Died (1980)
 Sweet Dreams (1981)
 Buddy Goes West (1981)
 Bonnie and Clyde Italian Style (1982)
 Amityville II: The Possession (1982)
 The Night of the Shooting Stars (1982)
 Fighting Back (1982)
 The World of Don Camillo (1983)
 Un povero ricco (1983)
 The Mass Is Ended (1985)
 Christopher Columbus (1985)
 Casablanca, Casablanca (1985)
 The Inquiry (1986)
 La Storia (1986)
 Dark Eyes (1987)
 A Boy from Calabria (1987)
 It's Happening Tomorrow (1988)
 Run for Your Life (1988)
 La bottega dell'orefice (1989)
 'O Re - The King of Naples (1989)
 Rossini! Rossini! (1991)
 Money (1991)
 A Fine Romance (1991)
 Parenti serpenti (1992)
 The Storm Is Coming (1993)
 Il Postino: The Postman (1994)
 Foreign Student (1994)
 Romanzo di un giovane povero (1995)
 We Free Kings (1996)
 The Dinner (1998)
 Jet Set (2000)
 Resurrection (2001)
 Luisa Sanfelice (2004)

References

External links 
 

1932 births
2016 deaths
People from the Province of Rieti
Italian cinematographers
David di Donatello winners